Cyclus Sports is an American UCI Continental cycling team founded in 2018.

Team roster

References

UCI Continental Teams (America)
Cycling teams established in 2018
Cycling teams based in the United States